Mr. Errababu is a 2005 Indian Telugu-language romantic drama film directed by K Kishore and starring Sivaji and newcomer Roma.

Plot 
The film follows Mr. Erra Babu (Sivaji) as he falls in love with London girl Pooja (Roma) in Lankapalli. Pooja's father Chakravarthy wants Pooja to be married to an NRI rich man. How Erra Babu and Pooja reunite form the rest of the story.

Cast 

Sivaji as Erra Babu 
Roma as Pooja 
Nagendra Babu as Chakravarthy 
Sunil
Satyanarayana
Venu Madhav
Krishna Bhagavan
Raghu Babu
Srinivasa Reddy
Ahuti Prasad
 Sreeram Edida
 Amitha
Rajya Lakshmi
Vijayachander
Chakravarthy Ramachandra
Asha Saini (item song)

Production
Chennai-based model Roma made her debut with this film. The film is produced by NRI Sunil Chalamalasetty and was shot in London and Rajahmundry.

Soundtrack 
Music for the film was composed by Koti.

Reception
Jeevi of Idlebrain.com wrote that "When we have NRIs producing Telugu films, we expect a minimum quality in terms of storyline, treatment and aesthetics. But Euro Andhra Entertainments banner disappoints with such a mundane film executed in mediocre style". A critic from Sify wrote that "On the whole, this film lacks a good script and moves at snail pace. You can predict every other scene and offers little in the way of surprise in the climax". A critic from Indiaglitz wrote that "Shivaji's acting passes muster, Roma also acquits herself well. But why such a movie? After seeing the movie, the question rings like Satre's existentialist queries".

References

External links